100 Great Black Britons is a poll that was first undertaken in 2003 to vote for and celebrate the greatest Black Britons of all time. It was created in a campaign initiated by Patrick Vernon in response to a BBC search for 100 Greatest Britons, together with a television series (2002), which featured no Black Britons in the published listing. The result of Vernon's campaign was that in February 2004 Mary Seacole was announced as having been voted the greatest Black Briton. Following the original poll, 100 Great Black Britons was re-launched in 2020 in an updated version based on public voting, together with a book of the same title.

Background to 2003 poll 
In 2002, the BBC launched a campaign and television series called 100 Greatest Britons with the definition of a great Briton as "anyone who was born in the British Isles, or who has lived in the British Isles, and has played a significant part in the life of the British Isles". The series was the idea of Jane Root, then Controller of BBC Two, and in the final results of the BBC poll, Winston Churchill was voted "the greatest Briton ever". At the time, the poll was criticised for lacking in diversity, as out of 100 nominees only 13 were women while none were Black (of African descent).

In response to the absence of any Black people in the "100 Greatest Britons poll", Every Generation and Patrick Vernon launched a website and the alternative campaign, 100 Great Black Britons, in October 2003 during Black History Month to "raise the profile of the Black contribution to Britain". Vernon said: "Black history hasn't been recognised. We didn't come here at Windrush in [1948] – we've been here for a thousand years. We've influenced and shaped Britain." Believing that people were not aware of the long history of Black people in the UK, he later added that the poll was part of a campaign to provide role models of Black Britons of all ages. The website that hosted the survey www.100greatestblackbritons.com received more than a million hits during the online campaign, and more than 100,000 people voted in the poll over three months, choosing from a selection of present-day and historic Black figures. The poll has been described as a landmark moment and one of the most successful movements to focus on the role of people of African and Caribbean descent in British history.

Mary Seacole topped the subsequent list of 100 Greatest Black Britons, a nurse who helped soldiers during the Crimean War and who is often overshadowed by the work of her contemporary, Florence Nightingale and whose contribution was often ignored by the history books. Other figures in the first poll of 100 Greatest Black Britons of all time included musicians, politicians, media figures, religious leaders and even royalty. Response to the list saw Black historical figures being added to the school curriculum, blue plaques were put up in memory of some of the individuals on the list and a statue of Mary Seacole was unveiled in the garden of St Thomas' Hospital in London. In March 2020, a petition was started to campaign for the temporary field hospital in Birmingham to be named after Mary Seacole after it was established that Birmingham's National Exhibition Centre would be used to treat COVID-19 patients: this was in response to the temporary hospital at London's ExCel centre being named the Nightingale Hospital after Florence Nightingale.

Criticism 
Paul Phoenix, of Black Parents in Education, criticised the poll for being inspired by the 100 Greatest Britons poll and copying the idea. Phoenix said, "Why do we always have to keep reacting to what other people do? We should celebrate our heroes every single day the year and not wait until Black History Month to bring these issues to public attention". Sam Walker, of the Black Cultural Archives, responded in support of the 100 Great Black Britons poll, stating that "it doesn't matter whether the poll is a copycat idea; so is Black History Month, which came from America in the late 1980s and has served us well to date".

The inclusion of Queen Philippa of Hainault on the list was criticised, as historians dispute that she was "black" in any modern sense. She was of predominantly European ancestry, with remote Armenian ancestry on her father's side, and Cuman (Turkic/Asian) ancestry on her mother's side. A report written by Bishop Walter de Stapledon in c.1319 describes either Philippa (then a child) or one of her sisters as "brown of skin all over", with hair "betwixt blue-black and brown"; but, aside from the confusion over who is being described, it is unclear precisely what these terms imply. All known portraits appear to show Philippa as white. Historian Kathryn Warner concludes that she was "a European woman and emphatically not of African ancestry".

2003 poll results

Top 10

2003 poll – full list 

 Diane Abbott
 Ira Aldridge
 Dounne Alexander
 Baroness Valerie Amos
 Viv Anderson
 John Archer
 Joan Armatrading
 Jennette Arnold
 Jazzie B
 Francis Barber
 John Barnes
 Dame Jocelyn Barrow
 Dame Shirley Bassey
 Brendan Batson
 Floella Benjamin  
 Nigel Benn
 Patrick Berry
 Oswald Boateng
 Paul Boateng
 Nana Bonsu
 George Bridgetower
 Yvonne Brewster
 Errol Brown
 Elizabeth Barrett Browning
 Frank Bruno
 Naomi Campbell 
 David Case
 Queen Charlotte
 Linford Christie
 Samuel Coleridge-Taylor
 Lord Leary Constantine
 John Conteh
 William Cuffay  
 Ottobah Cuguano
 Craig David
 Des'ree
 Desmond Douglas
 Niger Val Dub
 Ms. Dynamite
 John Edmonstone
 Olaudah Equiano
 Chris Eubank
 Michael Fuller
 Gabrielle
 Len Garrison
 Goldie
 Bernie Grant
 Jeremy Guscott
 Professor Stuart Hall
 Al Hamilton
 Ellery Hanley
 Sir Lenny Henry
 Peter Herbert
 Baroness Roselind Howells
 Paul Ince
 Colin Jackson
 Lee Jasper
 Linton Kwesi Johnson
 Claudia Jones
 Janet Kay
 Kanya King
 Baroness Oona King
 Beverley Knight
 Cleo Laine
 David Lammy
 Stephen Lawrence
 Angie Le Mar
 Denise Lewis
 Lennox Lewis
 George of Lydda
 Phil Lynott
 Dr. O. A. Lyseight
 Val McCalla
 Sir Trevor McDonald
 Paul McGrath
 Dr. Harold Moody
 Lord Bill Morris
 Martin Offiah 
 Chris Ofili
 Ben Okri
 Bruce Oldfield
 Lord Herman Ouseley
 Mica Paris
 Queen Philippa
 Trevor Phillips
 Courtney Pine
 Lord David Pitt
 Mary Prince
 Sade
 Ignatius Sancho
 Tessa Sanderson
 Baroness Patricia Scotland
 Mary Seacole 
 Seal
 Emperor Septimius Severus
 Zadie Smith
 Julius Soubise
 Moira Stuart
 Lord John Taylor
 Caroll Thompson
 Daley Thompson
 Randolph Turpin
 Rudolph Walker
 Andrew Watson
 Robert Wedderburn
 Arthur Wharton
 Willard White
 Henry Sylvester Williams
 Bishop Wilfred Wood
 Ian Wright
 Benjamin Zephaniah

2019–2020 relaunch 
In 2019, the decision was taken to relaunch and update the 100 Great Black Britons poll 16 years after the first poll. This was made in reaction to the lack of awareness in the general of public to Black British culture, establishment in Britain and Black Britons in general, in addition to both the "Windrush scandal" and the 2016 United Kingdom European Union membership referendum. The campaign and poll was re-launched by Vernon and Dr Angeline Osborne, an independent researcher and heritage consultant, in the wake of the Windrush scandal, the Brexit referendum, the rise of right-wing populism and the continuing economic issues faced by black communities across the UK. Repeating the poll was believed to be of great importance as academics and independent scholars have discovered new Black British historical figures and new role models have emerged since the first poll in 2003. The poll and campaign was re-launched to celebrate and tackle the invisibility of Black people's achievements and contributions in the UK. The public was invited to vote for the most-admired Black Briton in several categories, and from the thousands of nominations received in 2019 a shortlist was selected.

As part of the 100 Great Black Britons campaign, children and young people have been encouraged to explore Black British history and celebrate the continued legacy and achievements of Black people in Britain. The competition is sponsored by the National Education Union (NEU) and Kevin Courtney, the NEU's joint general secretary has said: "The NEU supports this competition to celebrate what we have always known: that Britain's history is irrefutably rooted in black and global history". Schools have also been encouraged to engage with the competition, with suggestions that young people could dress up as their favourite Black Briton, create a project or write an essay to honour the legacy and heritage of Black Britons and to celebrate Black British history. Arike Oke, managing director of Black Cultural Archives, has said: "The resources on the 100 Great Black Britons site can be used by families, parents, guardians and carers to help children understand themselves and their wider history".

The results of the updated poll were revealed in a new book published on 24 September 2020. The 2020 list was compiled by a panel after the public was invited to submit nominations and, according to Vernon, "could easily have been called 1,000 Great Black Britons", based on the volume of nominations, which have been listed in the book, alongside biographies of the top 100. The selection was made from among people who have made major contributions to arts, science, business, philanthropy and other areas in the UK and who had used their positions to advance the Black community. Described by the Hackney Citizen as "inspiring and highly educational", the book was ranked at the top of the Amazon book charts two weeks before it was published. With the book's publication, a campaign was launched to pay for a copy to be sent to every secondary school, against the background of calls for Black and other minorities' history to be added to the National Curriculum being rejected by the government.

2020 list 
Unlike the earlier list, the 2020 list is not ranked: 

 Diane Abbott
 Victor Adebowale, Baron Adebowale CBE
 Ade Adepitan MBE
 Dr Maggie Aderin-Pocock MBE
 Professor Hakim Adi
 Sir David Adjaye OM, OBE, RA
 John Agard FRSL
 Akala
 John Akomfrah CBE
 Ira Aldridge
 Valerie Amos, Baroness Amos CH
 Kehinde Andrews
 Professor Dame Elizabeth Anionwu OM, DBE
 Dr Elaine Arnold
 Amma Asante MBE
 Winifred Atwell
 Dame Jocelyn Barrow DBE
 Colour Sergeant Johnson Beharry VC, COG
 Floella Benjamin, Baroness Benjamin of Beckenham OM, DBE, DL
 Munroe Bergdorf
 Jak Beula
 Karen Blackett OBE
 Malorie Blackman OBE
 John Blanke
 Dennis Bovell
 Sonia Boyce OBE, RA
 Dr Aggrey Burke
 Vanley Burke
 Margaret Busby CBE, Hon. FRSL
 Dawn Butler
 Earl Cameron CBE
 Betty Campbell MBE
 Naomi Campbell
 Queen Charlotte
 Edric Connor
 Lloyd Coxsone
 William Cuffay
 Quobna Ottobah Cugoano
 William Davidson
 Dame Linda Dobbs DBE
 John Edmonstone
 Idris Elba OBE
 Edward Enninful OBE
 Olaudah Equiano
 Bernardine Evaristo OBE, FRSL
 Sir Mohamed Muktar Jama Farah CBE
 Lenford Kwesi Garrison
 George the Poet
 Paul Gilroy
 Bernie Grant
 Stuart Hall
 Sir Lewis Hamilton MBE
 Sir Lenny Henry CBE
 Lubaina Himid CBE, RA
 Dame Kelly Holmes DBE
 Darcus Howe
 Rose Hudson-Wilkin MBE
 Eric Huntley and Jessica Huntley
 Professor Gus John
 Linton Kwesi Johnson
 Claudia Jones
 Sheku Kanneh-Mason MBE
 Jackie Kay CBE
 Sam King MBE
 Kwame Kwei-Armah OBE
 John La Rose
 David Lammy
 Marai Larasi MBE
 Doreen Lawrence, Baroness Lawrence of Clarendon OBE
 Andrea Levy
 Sir Steve McQueen CBE
 Thomas Molyneux
 Dr Harold Moody
 Olive Morris
 Grace Nichols FRSL
 Chi-chi Nwanoku OBE
 David Olusoga OBE
 Phyllis Opoku-Gyimah
 Olivette Otele
 Horace Ové CBE
 Elsie Owusu OBE, RIBA
 David Oyelowo OBE
 George Padmore
 Professor Sir Geoff Palmer OBE
 Alex Pascall OBE
 David Pitt, Baron Pitt of Hampstead
 Mary Prince
 Marvin Rees
 Bill Richmond
 Marcia Rigg
 Ignatius Sancho
 Stafford Scott
 Mary Seacole
 Menelik Shabazz
 Yinka Shonibare CBE, RA
 Paul Stephenson OBE
 Stormzy
 Robert Wedderburn
 Dame Sharon White DBE
 Henry Sylvester Williams
 Allan Wilmot
 Simon Woolley, Baron Woolley of Woodford
 Gary Younge
 Benjamin Zephaniah

Book
 Patrick Vernon and Angelina Osborne, 100 Great Black Britons. Foreword by David Olusoga. London: Robinson, 2020, .

See also
 List of Black Britons

References

Greatest Nationals
Lists of British people
Lists of black people
Black British history
Black British people
Lists of British award winners
Black elite